Volodymyr Hryhorovych Yatsuba (Ukrainian: Володимир Григорович Яцуба; born on 1 July 1947), is a Ukrainian politician who served as Governor of Sevastopol from 2011 to 2014.

References

External links
 Volodymyr Yatsuba at the Official Ukraine today

1947 births
Living people
Politicians from Dnipro
National Metallurgical Academy of Ukraine alumni
National Academy of State Administration alumni
Communist Party of Ukraine (Soviet Union) politicians
Party of Regions politicians
First convocation members of the Verkhovna Rada
Sixth convocation members of the Verkhovna Rada
Cabinet Office ministers of Ukraine
Governors of Dnipropetrovsk Oblast
Academic staff of the National Academy of State Administration
Regional development and construction ministers of Ukraine
Governors of Sevastopol (Ukraine)
Presidential representatives of Ukraine in Crimea
Recipients of the Order of Prince Yaroslav the Wise, 4th class
Recipients of the Honorary Diploma of the Cabinet of Ministers of Ukraine